TSIC may refer to:

Organizations
 Take Stock in Children, a nonprofit organization based in Miami, Florida, United States
 Telia Carrier, formerly named TeliaSonera International Carrier
 The Social Investment Consultancy, a consultancy firm found in UK